Prospect Foundation, is a think tank based in Taiwan, established in 1997, which aims to analyze the Cross-Taiwan-Strait relations and  international politics and economy and provide suggestions of policies for Taiwan government. There are about a dozen of research fellows in Prospect Foundation who research and analyze the development of Cross-Strait relations and international developments.

The Prospect Foundation ranks 94th in the Top Think Tanks in Southeast Asia and the Pacific of Global Go To Think Tank Index 2017 report published by Think Tanks and Civil Societies Program.

History 
After Tsai Ing-wen assumed the office of president in Taiwan, former secretary of Ministry Of Foreign Affairs, Dr. Tan-sun Chen(Traditional Chinese 陳唐山) serves as the chairman of the Prospect Foundation on August 10, 2016, and I-chung Lai(Traditional Chinese 賴怡忠) serves as the president of the Prospect Foundation and Tin-huey Lin(Traditional Chinese 林廷輝) serves as the vice president.

Publications 
The Prospect Foundation periodically publish 《Prospect Journal》 in English and 《Prospect Foundation Quarterly》 in traditional Chinese.

Research Focus 
 New Southbound Policy convergence with Free and Open Indo-Pacific strategy of the United States
 Yushan Forum Asia Dialogue for Innovation and Progress, the Prospect Foundation hosted, is Taiwan government's New Southbound Policy discussion panel. Chairman of Prospect Foundation, former secretary of Ministry Of Foreign Affairs, Dr. Tan-sun Chen, addresses that the focuses of New Southbound Policy are on trade, agriculture, education, scientific research in medicine and technology with ASEAN and South Asia countries.

Global Participations 
 Taiwan-ASEAN Dialogue, the Prospect Foundation cohost with Indonesian think tank The Indonesian Council on World Affairs and The Habibie Centre in Taipei, attended by about 200 former and current parliamentarians, diplomats and scholars from Taiwan and ASEAN, including Singapore's trade representative Mr. Simon Wong and president Tsai Ing-wen on the opening address.
 The Prospect Foundation members hold discussion with think tank Institute for Defence Studies and Analyses, in India, on India-China relationships, India-Taiwan relationships and India-Japan relationships.
 2017 Taiwan-US-Japan Trilateral Security Dialogue, is co-hosted by the Prospect Foundation with think tanks Heritage Foundation from United States and The Sasakawa Peace Foundation from Japan.

 Asia Pacific Security Dialogue is hosted by the Prospect Foundation and the Prospect Foundation invited president Tsai Ing-wen of Taiwan for the opening address and also invited former Secretary of Defense and Vice President of United States, Richard B. Cheney to Taipei, to discuss pros and cons of the New Southbound Policy.

 In Yushan Forum-Asian Dialogue for Innovation and Progress, former Vice President of the Philippine, Jejomar Binay addressed on Yushan Forum Asia Dialogue on the Prospect Foundation's research and development programs of health care cooperation between Taiwan and Philippine.
 The Prospect Foundation paid a visit to Office of International Affairs, Thammasat University of Thailand on New Southbound Policy cooperations.

References

External links 
 Prospect Foundation official website

Think tanks
Think tanks based in Taiwan
Think tanks established in 1997